This article displays the awards and nominations of the Jazz band Weather Report.

Grammy Awards
The Grammy Awards are awarded annually by the National Academy of Recording Arts and Sciences of the United States. Weather Report won one Grammy from six nominations.

|-
|1972
|I Sing The Body Electric
|Best Jazz Instrumental Album
|
|-
|1979
|8:30
|Best Jazz Fusion Performance
|
|-
|1981
|Night Passage
|Best Jazz Fusion Performance
|
|-
|1982
|Weather Report
|Best Jazz Fusion Performance
|
|-
|1983
|Procession
|Best Jazz Fusion Performance
|
|-
|1985
|Sportin' Life
|Best Jazz Fusion Performance
|

DownBeat Awards

|-
|1971
|Weather Report
|Jazz Combo of the Year
|
|-
|1972
|Weather Report
|Jazz Combo of the Year
|
|-
|1973
|Weather Report
|Jazz Combo of the Year
|
|-
|1974
|Mysterious Traveller
|Jazz Album of the Year
|
|-
|1974
|Weather Report
|Jazz Combo of the Year
|
|-
|1975
|Weather Report
|Jazz Combo of the Year
|
|-
|1975
|Tale Spinnin'
|Jazz Album of the Year
|
|-
|1976
|Weather Report
|Jazz Combo of the Year
|
|-
|1976
|Black Market
|Jazz Album of the Year
|
|-
|1974
|Weather Report
|Jazz Combo of the Year
|
|-
|1977
|Heavy Weather
|Jazz Album of the Year
|
|-
|1977
|"Weather Report"
|Jazz Group of the Year
|
|-
|1978
|"Weather Report"
|Jazz Group of the Year
|
|-
|1983
|"Weather Report"
|Jazz Group of the Year
|

Other accolades

Heavy Weather, 1977 Record of the Year, Jazz Forum magazine People's Poll
Swing Journal Silver Disc Award
Playboy Jazz Record and Jazz Band of the Year
Record World Instrumental Group of the Year
Cash Box Record of the Year

References

Weather Report